Paopi 12 - Coptic Calendar - Paopi 14

The thirteenth day of the Coptic month of Paopi, the second month of the Coptic year. On a common year, this day corresponds to October 10, of the Julian Calendar, and October 23, of the Gregorian Calendar. This day falls in the Coptic season of Peret, the season of emergence.

Commemorations

Saints 

 The departure of Saint Zacharias, the Monk

References 

Days of the Coptic calendar